Karthik Calling Karthik is a 2010 Indian psychological thriller film, written and directed by Vijay Lalwani and produced by Farhan Akhtar and Ritesh Sidhwani under the banner of Excel Entertainment. The film stars Farhan Akhtar and Deepika Padukone in lead roles. Ram Kapoor, Vivan Bhatena, Vipin Sharma and Shefali Shah play supporting roles in the film. The film's music was composed by the trio of Shankar–Ehsaan–Loy, while the background score was composed by MIDIval Punditz and Karsh Kale. A few of the scenes were copied from various movies like American movie Wanted (2008).

Plot
Karthik Narayan (Farhan Akhtar) is an introvert who lacks confidence and feels trapped in his average job at a construction company. He is continuously troubled by an incident from his childhood: His elder brother, Kumar, used to torture him, but whenever he complained to his parents, they did not believe him. One day, Kumar took Karthik to a well and tried to throw him in it, but Karthik escaped. Kumar accidentally fell inside the well and died. Karthik has thought himself responsible for his brother's death ever since.

Shonali Mukherjee (Deepika Padukone) is a co-worker at Karthik's company, whom Karthik secretly loved though she remains unaware of his existence, much less his feelings. After being derided by his boss Mr Kamath (Ram Kapoor) yet again; Karthik figures his life can't get any worse and decides to commit suicide. Just as he is about to, a stranger with the same, exact voice as his, calls and says that he is also Karthik, convincing him that he has the ability to change his life. These phone calls become Karthik's life guide. His chats take place every morning at 5:00 a.m. and the caller provides advice on Karthik's problems, guiding him to become a successful man, win Shonali's heart, and bring color to his otherwise dreary life.

However, when Karthik tells Shonali and his psychiatrist about the phone calls, despite being warned not to, the mysterious caller gets angry and tells Karthik that if he could bring him up, he could also throw him down. As per his word, things start going downhill. Karthik's boss throws him out and Shonali leaves him. Karthik decides that if he goes somewhere he does not know, then the caller wouldn't know where he is either and stop calling him. Karthik travels to an unknown place, takes shelter in a small hotel, and asks the receptionist to remove the telephone and room number plate.

After a few months, Karthik is comfortably living in Cochin with a decent job. His life is back to normal except for the fact that he refuses to have a phone line. Upon his boss's request, he is forced to purchase a landline. He goes to great lengths to ensure that he himself is unaware of the phone number. However, one day at exactly 5 a.m, he receives a call from the mysterious caller, who threatens to kill him. Meanwhile, Shonali is contacted by Dr. Shweta Kapadia (Shefali Shah), who reveals the twist: Karthik actually suffers from schizophrenia, a mental disorder characterized by abnormal social behavior and failure to understand reality. He has an alter-ego that is more assertive and advises him on how to live life. It is revealed that the strange caller was Karthik himself. He has been dealing with this condition from a young age, when he created a fake brother named Kumar with his imagination (which is why his parents never believed him). Karthik's phone has the capacity to record messages and act as a playback feature at a certain time. Karthik would wake up in the middle of the night, leave himself messages as his alter ego, and return to sleep, where he would awake once again at 5 AM to take his own calls.

Eventually, Karthik becomes so disturbed that he attempts to commit suicide again. Shonali, realizing the truth, arrives at the right time to save him. They reconcile and she stands by him, helping him with his condition. After a few months, Karthik is in the process of dealing with his disorder and lives a happy and rehabilitated life with Shonali by his side.

Cast
 Farhan Akhtar as Karthik "Cheeku" Narayan
 Deepika Padukone as Shonali Mukharjee
 Ram Kapoor as Kamath Sir
 Shefali Shah as Dr. Shweta Kapadia
 Vivan Bhatena as Ashish
 Vipin Sharma as Landlord
 Tarana Raja as Neelu Didi, Karthik's cousin sister
 Vinay Jain as Siddharth "Sid", Neelu's husband
 Yatin Karyekar as Boss at Blue Draft Courier
 Swapnel Desai as Kumar Narayan, Karthik's brother
 Zafar as Mr. Narayan, Karthik's father
 Prachi as Mrs. Narayan, Karthik's mother
 Vidyadhar Karmakar as Old Man at Ticket Collecting Counter
 Brijendra Kala as Staff at Telephone Exchange

Production
In an effort to prepare for his role as loner introvert Karthik, Farhan Akhtar isolated himself at home and school and turned off his phone. He also learned to solve the Rubik's Cube, an activity which his character completes in only one try.

Release

Critical reception
The film received mixed reviews from critics. Nikhat Kazmi of Times of India rated the movie 3.5/5 stars, calling it "immensely watchable, purely for the class act by Farhan Akhtar in the title role" and recommending it to those who are in the mood for serious cinema. Shweta Parande of News18 gave a rating of 3.5 out of 5, applauding the cast and crew for their performances and their efforts on building up the story as a team. Mayank Shekhar of Hindustan Times gave the film 3 out of 5 stars and wrote, "This one’s clearly not a formula film. It isn’t merely suspense for most parts either. It’s the kind of thriller that practically every Bollywood B, or big budget, genre flick aspires for." Anupama Chopra of NDTV gave it 2.5 out of 5 stars and stated that "it isn't a bad film, but it isn't very good either". Taran Adarsh of Bollywood Hungama gave the movie 2.5 out of 5 stars calling it "a decent product with an unconvincing conclusion". Sukanya Verma of Rediff.com gave the film a 2.5/5 rating, praising Farhan Akhtar for his versatility, while simultaneously criticizing Deepika Padukone for not being able to "hold a single scene on her own".

Box office
Karthik Calling Karthik was declared a below average hit at box office.

Soundtrack

The soundtrack of the film is composed by Shankar–Ehsaan–Loy with lyrics penned by Javed Akhtar. The album was released on 20 February 2010.

Though the album did not get favorable critical reviews, the track "Uff Teri Adaa" created waves and topped the charts numerous times in the following months. At the box office, the music had an impact in the opening of the film, as it got a bigger opening than its competitor Teen Patti.

Before the album got released, an online copy was leaked onto the Internet. Farhan Akhtar confirmed this and requested people to not download it illegally.

Track listing

Awards and nominations
12th IIFA Awards
Nominated
Best Male Playback Singer – Shankar Mahadevan
17th Screen Awards
Nominated
Best Music Director – Shankar–Ehsaan–Loy
14th Zee Cine Awards
Nominated
Best Music Director – Shankar–Ehsaan–Loy

3rd Mirchi Music Awards
Nominated
 Male Vocalist of The Year – Shankar Mahadevan for "Uff Teri Adaa"
 Upcoming Female Vocalist of The Year – Sukanya Purayastha for "Kaisi Hai Yeh Udaasi"
 Best Song Recording – Abhay Rumde, Sameeer Khan, Kim Koshie, Chinmay Harshe and Vijay Benegal for "Uff Teri Adaa"

References

External links
 
 
 

2010 films
2010s Hindi-language films
Films about films
Indian psychological thriller films
2010 psychological thriller films